Joker: Folie à Deux is an upcoming American musical film directed by Todd Phillips from a screenplay he co-wrote with Scott Silver. Produced by Warner Bros. Pictures, Village Roadshow Pictures, DC Studios, Bron Creative and Joint Effort, and distributed by Warner Bros. Pictures, the film is based on the Joker and other characters appearing in DC Comics publications, serving as the sequel to Joker (2019). The film's cast features Joaquin Phoenix and Zazie Beetz reprising their roles as Arthur Fleck / Joker and Sophie Dumond respectively from the first film, alongside Lady Gaga, Brendan Gleeson and Catherine Keener.

Filming for Joker: Folie à Deux began in December 2022. It is scheduled to be released theatrically on October 4, 2024.

Cast
 Joaquin Phoenix as Arthur Fleck / Joker: A mentally ill, impoverished party clown and stand-up comedian disregarded by society, whose history of abuse causes him to become a nihilistic criminal with a clown motif.
 Lady Gaga as Harley Quinn: A psychiatrist who falls in love with Arthur.
 Zazie Beetz as Sophie Dumond: A cynical single mother whom Arthur fantasized as his love interest, but in reality, they met once.

Additionally, Brendan Gleeson, Catherine Keener, Jacob Lofland and Harry Lawtey have been cast in undisclosed roles.

Production

Development 
The 2019 film Joker was intended to be a standalone with no sequels, but Warner Bros. intended for it to launch DC Black, a line of DC Comics-based films unrelated to the DC Extended Universe (DCEU) franchise with darker, more experimental material, similar to the DC Black Label comics publisher. While director Todd Phillips said in August 2019 that he would be interested in making a sequel, depending on the film's performance and if Joaquin Phoenix is interested, he later clarified that "the movie's not set up to [have] a sequel. We always pitched it as one movie, and that's it." In October 2019, Phoenix spoke to journalist Peter Travers of possibly reprising the role of Arthur, centering around Travers' asking of Phoenix if he considers Joker to be his "dream role." Phoenix stated, "I can't stop thinking about it...if there's something else we can do with Joker that might be interesting," and concluded, "It's nothing that I really wanted to do prior to working on this movie. I don't know that there is [more to do] ... Because it seemed endless, the possibilities of where we can go with the character." He was paid $20 million for his involvement.

In November 2019, The Hollywood Reporter announced that a sequel was in development, with Phillips, Silver, and Phoenix expected to reprise their duties. However, Deadline Hollywood reported the same day that The Hollywood Reporter story was false and that negotiations had not even begun yet. Phillips responded to the reports by saying that he had discussed a sequel with Warner Bros. and it remained a possibility, but it was not in development. Phillips also confirmed that The Batman (2022) would not be set in the same continuity as Joker. During an interview with Variety at the Palm Springs International Film Festival, Phillips expressed interest in a spin-off focusing on Batman, saying "It's a beautiful Gotham. What I would like to see someone tackle is what Batman looks like from that Gotham. I'm not saying I'm going to do that. What was interesting to me about the inclusion of Batman in our movie was 'What kind of Batman does that Gotham make?' That's all I meant by that."

In June 2022, Phillips announced that the sequel was in development, with a script by him and Silver. The film was also revealed to be titled Joker: Folie à Deux. Later that month, it was announced Lady Gaga was in talks to portray Harley Quinn and that the film would be a musical. Shortly afterward, Gaga confirmed that she would star in the film. In August, it was reported Zazie Beetz was in negotiations to reprise her role as Sophie Dumond in the film. Beetz was confirmed to reprise her role in September, alongside Brendan Gleeson, Catherine Keener and Jacob Lofland. Gleeson joined the project out of his admiration for both Phoenix's "indelible" performance in the first film and Gaga, though he admitted to being "kinda intimidated" as to what he had to do for his role. In October, Harry Lawtey was reported by Deadline Hollywood to have been cast in the film in what was reported as a "big role". By February 2023, DC Studios CEO James Gunn officially confirmed the film would be a DC Elseworlds project, taking place outside the main cinematic DC Universe (DCU).

Filming 
Principal photography began on December 10, 2022, with Phillips releasing a first look on his Instagram account. Exterior filming occurred in Los Angeles by March 2023.

Music 
Hildur Guðnadóttir will score the sequel, returning from the first film.

Release 
Joker: Folie à Deux is scheduled to be released theatrically in the United States on October 4, 2024, by Warner Bros Pictures.

Notes

References

External links 
 

2020s musical films
2024 films
American crime drama films
American crime thriller films
American films about revenge
American musical drama films
American musical films
American psychological drama films
American psychological thriller films
American thriller drama films
Bron Studios films
Films about criminals
Films about intellectual disability
Films about murderers
Films based on DC Comics
Films directed by Todd Phillips
Films produced by Bradley Cooper
Films produced by Todd Phillips
Films scored by Hildur Guðnadóttir
Films set in prison
Films set in psychiatric hospitals
Films with screenplays by Scott Silver
Films with screenplays by Todd Phillips
Harley Quinn in other media
Joker (character) in other media
Live-action films based on comics
Supervillain films
Village Roadshow Pictures films
Warner Bros. films
Upcoming sequel films